The Amata Spring Country Club is a private golf and country club near to Bangkok, the capital of Thailand. It hosts two high-profile golf tournaments which were introduced in 2006. The Royal Trophy is a team competition between Europe and Asia, and the Honda LPGA Thailand is the first LPGA Tour event in Thailand. These are currently the two richest golf events held in Thailand. The club has a single 18-hole course of 7,322 yards that loops around two lakes and some other water hazards. It was designed by Schmidt Curley Golf Design.

External links
royaltrophy.com page with maps and photos
Amata Spring Country Club course information

Golf clubs and courses in Thailand